Mavoor Road is the busiest High street of Kozhikode city in Kerala, India.  This road connects the Mananchira pond area with the Kozhikode Medical College.  After the medical college, the road is extended further to the little village of Mavoor but the term 'Mavoor Road' refers to the section between the city and the Medical college.

History
100 years ago the beach area was the centre of Kozhikode city.  In the 1970s the downtown shifted to Mananchira area and again, in the 1980s, Mavoor Road became the centre of attraction.  In 2010s, Thondayad Bypass area and Palazhi on the Airport road has emerged as the new city centre with a vibrant night life.

Jaffer Khan Colony
Jaffer Khan Street is a commercial locality in the heart of Kozhikode city.  This colony is located opposite to the new bus station in the Mavoor Road.  The street has a Muslim flavor because of a large number of perfume shops frequented by Arab visitors.  The locality also has many mosques, a Hajj house and several Sunni cultural centres.  The Oyiska Youth Centre is located on the other side of the Jaffer Khan Colony across the footpath on the swamp.  The Brahmakumaris have a big meditation centre in this colony.  The northern end of the street is called Ashokapuram.

 Bhima Jewellers
 H & C Books
 South Indian Bank
 Space Mall
 Edumart Academic Hypermarket
 ICAI Bhavan
 LaVesta Cafe
 More Supermarket

The Planetarium

The Regional Science Centre and Planetarium is a popular destination of schoolchildren.  This facility is maintained by the Central Government.  There are regular exhibitions and shows inside the campus.  In addition to the main show, the centre also has a theatre for 3-D demonstrations for the children.  The compound is also very spacious and attractive.

Balan K Nair Road
Balan K Nair Road begins from near the Zoological Survey of India near Jaffer Khan colony.  It connects to Rajendra Nursing Home and Nadakkavu localities.  K.P.Chandran Road moves in the opposite direction and connects to Sarovaram Bio Park. The road to the northern side connects to Jawahar Nagar and Kottaram Road areas.

KSRTC Bus Station

KSRTC Kozhikode is the biggest bus station of North Kerala in India.  It is situated on the Mavoor Road on the western side of Kozhikode city.  The shopping facility attached to the bus station has a plinth area of 350,000 sq.feet.  Parking space is provided for 270 cars.

U.K.Shankaran Road
U.K.Shankaran Road is a small street starting from the opposite side of L.B.S.Computer College on the Mavoor Road.  This street has Our College, Madhyamam City office and an SIO office.  The road diverts to the western side and ends up at the Animals Hospital on the Wayanad Road.

Ashokapuram
Ashokapuram Junction connects Mavoor Road with the Nadakkavu area. Ashokapuram has prominent organizations like Rajendra Nursing Home, IHRD College, Marx Engels Bhavan and BSNL GM Office.

Junctions
 Mavoor Road Junction 
 Rajaji Road Junction 
 Arayidathupalam Junction 
 Thondayad 
 Chevayur 
 Kovoor 
 Medical College

Commercial
Mavoor Road is a high end Commercial Street there are several IT Training Centres, Salons, Gyms, Supermarkets, Retail Stores and Boutique, Banks, Airline Office, Restaurants that have opened up on the stretch

Supermarkets 

 Reliance Fresh, Pottammal
 Big Bazaar
 Nesto Hypermarket, Gokulam Galleria Mall Arayidathupalam Junction

Jewellery
 Chemmanur International Jewellers
 Kalyan Jewellers, Parayanchery
 Tanishq
 Meralda Jewels, Parayanchery
 Lulu Gold, Parayanchery
 Cammilli Diamond And Gold, Parayanchery
 Sunny Diamonds, Parayanchery
 Apollo De Valeur, Patteri

Banks 

 Federal Bank
 Axis Bank, Parayanchery
 Catholic Syrian Bank, Parayanchery
 IDBI Bank, Kottooli
 ICICI Bank, Pottammal
 State Bank Of India, Pottammal
 Ujjivan Small Finance Bank
 Kerala Gramin Bank
 Canara Bank
 Union Bank of India
 Central Bank of India
 Syndicate Bank

Restaurants & cafes

 Barbeque Nation, Parayanchery
 KFC, RP Mall
 Brown Town By Paragon, Pottammal
 Bun Club 
 Sijis Pizza Street
 Savoury Seashell Restaurant, Parayanchery
 Favrolls
 Burger Lounge 
 Frapino
 Oyalo Pizza
 Indian Coffee House
 ChicKing, Pottammal
 Frootree
 Natural Ice Creams
 Calicut Karachi Durbar
 Pizza Hut
 Sagar Restaurant 
 Domino’s Pizza
 Cold Street

𝗦𝗵𝗼𝗽𝗽𝗶𝗻𝗴 𝗠𝗮𝗹𝗹𝘀

 RP Mall - Reliance Trends, KFC, Ashirvad Cineplexx 

 Gokulam Galleria Mall - Nesto Hypermarket, Westside, Easybuy, Max Fashion, Cinépolis, Pantaloons, Amoeba, Skechers, Basics, Jockey, Toni & Guy, ChicKing, Subway, Lenskart, Bata, Swiss Time House, Galito’s, and Store, W
 Kalyan Mall Thondayad
Retail stores

 Kasavu Kendra Wedding Center
 Helio Police, Bata, Woodland, Nandilath G Mart
 Big Bazaar, Calicut Silks
 MyG, Pottammal
 Kannankandy E store, Bridal Silks
 Silk Mandir 
 Van Heusen, Allen Solly, Levis, US Polo Assn,
 Linen Club, Shobhika Wedding Mall, Kalyan Silks, The Raymond Shop

Landmarks
 KSRTC Bus Stand Cum Shopping Complex
 Kairali Sree Theater
 The LBS Centre for Science and Technology
 Moffusil Bus Stand (New Bus stand Calicut)

Hospitals

 National Hospital 
 Baby Memorial Hospital 
 Government Medical College, Kozhikode

Laboratorys & clinic
 R Cell Diagnostics & Research Center 
 Micro Health Laboratories Pvt. Ltd
 Dr Scan Diagnostic Center 
 DDRC SRL Diagnostics Pvt.Ltd
 Mother Dental Hospital 
 Abeer Family Medical Center

Mavoor Road after Medical College
The term Mavoor Road is used only for the 8.3 km stretch of road between Mananchira and Calicut Medical College.  The road goes another 13 km and ends in Mavoor town.  This second stretch of Mavoor Road has many important towns and villages like: 
 Parayanchery
 Kottooli and Pottammal
 Thondayad
 Chevayur
 Kovoor
 Peruvayal
 Perumanna
 Mavoor

Educational institutions
 Presentation Higher Secondary School Chevayur

See also 
 Chevayur 
 Kottooli and Pottammal
 Kovoor Town
 Kuttikkattoor and Velliparamba
 Devagiri College

Location

References

External links

Roads in Kozhikode
Kozhikode downtown